Think Free may refer to:
 Think Free (Ben Allison album)
 Think Free (Freeway album)